Apiomerus is a genus of conspicuous, brightly colored assassin bugs belonging to the family Reduviidae. The species can be found in the United States ranging into tropical America. The common name bee assassins derives from their frequent habit of sitting and waiting upon flowers and taking bees as prey. The bright colors are aposematic, likely a warning to larger predators that a painful bite can be delivered.

Many species of this genus have a sticky resin pad located on their dorsal abdomen. The resin is thought to be derived from plant material and may play a role in defending eggs from predation, especially by ants.

The genus consists of about 110 described species.

Species in the genus include:
Apiomerus californicus Berniker & Szerlip, 2011
Apiomerus cazieri Berniker & Szerlip, 2011
Apiomerus cooremani Costa Lima, Campos Seabra & Hathaway, 1951
Apiomerus crassipes (Fabricius, 1803)
Apiomerus flaviventris Herrich-Schaeffer, 1846
Apiomerus floridensis Berniker & Szerlip, 2011
Apiomerus hirtipes (Fabricius, 1787)
Apiomerus immundus Bergroth, 1898
Apiomerus longispinis Champion, 1899
Apiomerus moestus Stål, 1862
Apiomerus montanus Berniker & Szerlip, 2011
Apiomerus peninsularis Berniker & Szerlip, 2011
Apiomerus pictipes Herrich-Schaeffer, 1846
Apiomerus pilipes Fabricius, 1787
Apiomerus repletus Uhler, 1876
Apiomerus rufipennis (Fallou, 1889)	 
Apiomerus spissipes (Say, 1825)
Apiomerus subpiceus Stål, 1862
Apiomerus wygodzinskyi Berniker & Szerlip, 2011

References

Schuh, R.T. & Slater, J. A. 1995. True bugs of the world (Hemiptera: Heteroptera): classification and natural history. New York, Cornell University Press, 336p.

External links 
 Bugguide hosted by Iowa State University Entomology
 Research of Apiomerus Systematics at UC Riverside
https://web.archive.org/web/20110726225254/http://nature.berkeley.edu/~dchoe003/index4.htm

 
Reduviidae
Cimicomorpha genera
Insects of Central America